The Caudron 02 was a French high altitude single seat fighter that was flown in November 1917.

Design and development

The proper name and even the existence of this aircraft have been disputed in the past, but plans for the Type 02 high altitude fighter aircraft have since been found in the French Musée de l'Air. Hauet also refers to it as the C.02 and Green and Swanborough as the Type O, though the latter was a quite different sports aircraft from 1914.

The Type 02 was designed to fight at altitudes up to  through a combination of engine power and flat airfoil section. It was a conventional single bay biplane with fabric covered, unswept, parallel chord wings ending in angled tips.  The lower wing was smaller than the upper one, with a span reduced by 13% and a narrower chord.  The wings had neither stagger nor dihedral and only the upper wing was fitted with ailerons. There  was a pair of parallel, upright, streamlined interplane struts on each side, with the usual diagonal wire bracing.  The upper wing was close to the fuselage, linked by four short, leaning cabane struts.

The intention was to power the Type 02 operationally with either a  Gnome 9N or a  Le Rhône 9R engine, though for about fours months of initial testing it was fitted with a  Le Rhône 9Jb.  All of these engines were nine cylinder rotaries. Photographs show neat, close fitted cowlings. Behind the engine the fuselage maintained a circular cross-section.  The pilot's open cockpit was placed under the upper trailing edge, where there was a semi-circular cut-out to increase his upward field of view. The Type 02's tailplane was of unusually long chord and in plan was a highly swept delta, mounted on top of the fuselage.  The fin was also wide and shallow, though less angular. It had an unbalanced rudder which reached down to the keel, operating in a nick in the elevators.  There was a tailskid undercarriage with mainwheels on a single axle with a  track, sprung from forward raked V-struts from the lower fuselage.

The more powerful Gnome engine was not tested until April 1918; and the larger Le Rhône was also fitted that spring. It is not known how many prototypes were built but the Type 02 did not enter production; it handled well but its performance and armament were not a significant improvement over those of the SPAD S.XIII, already in series production.

Specifications (Le Rhone 9R)

References

C.02
1910s French fighter aircraft
Rotary-engined aircraft
Biplanes
Aircraft first flown in 1917